Tom Murphy (born 1949) is an English artist who is best known for his bronze sculptures.

Murphy is a self-taught artist, starting his artistic career initially as a hobby and moved quickly to an intense period of self-study, mastering a range of techniques in many art disciplines.

Previously he worked in a number of occupations which included; a seaman, salesman, musician and impressionist in a pop group.

Later he graduated as a teacher at Liverpool John Moores University and taught art at the Liverpool Community College. He also worked at a Centre for People with Learning Difficulties. His differing careers and interest in the characteristics of people have both acted as a rich source of inspiration in both his paintings and sculptures.

His early experimenting in painting was finally appreciated when he won first prize in the BBC 'North West Art 88' competition. His big success in sculpture came in 1996 when his  sculpture of John Lennon was seen by a representative of major Liverpool Company, Littlewoods. He was commissioned to sculpt two monumental size bronzes of the Moores brothers for Liverpool's premier shopping area Church Street.

His work is all over the city of Liverpool as well as in Chorley, Lancashire, Metropolitan Borough of Knowsley, Merseyside, Germany and New York City. He has also sold many smaller works around the world.

In 2003, he was voted by Radio Merseyside listeners and Liverpool Echo readers as the 76th Greatest Merseysider.

Now his work is known all over the world since creating the iconic statue of John Lennon at Liverpool John Lennon Airport which was unveiled jointly on 15 March 2002, by Cherie Blair and Lennon's widow, Yoko Ono. His sculptures of Ken Dodd and Bessie Braddock, commissioned by Merseytravel are sited at Liverpool Lime Street railway station. Though best known for his large sculptures, he has always maintained his interest in a wide range of art disciplines and sectors. An accomplished painter, he has been commissioned to paint many key Merseyside figures including the official retirement portrait of Mr John Moores.

In 2015 his bronze sculpture of Trooper Potts VC and Trooper Andrews, of the Berkshire Yeomanry was unveiled by Chris Tarrant and the Lord Lieutenant of Berkshire. The Grandchildren of both Fred Potts and Arthur Andrews and many other descendants attended the unveiling ceremony along with Mayors and Chairs of Councils from across "Old Berkshire". Sited just outside Forbury Gardens, Reading Tom developed the design to appeal to children, young people and the military historian.  Cast by the Morris Singer Foundry it has a high degree of finish and much historical detail, including items lying on the Gallipoli Battlefield.

Notable works

References

External links
 

Living people
1949 births
English sculptors
English male sculptors
Modern sculptors